Perissomastix nigerica is a species of moth in the family Tineidae. It is found in Nigeria. It was described by Hungarian entomologist László Anthony Gozmány in 1967.

This species has a wingspan of about 15 mm. Thorax and forewings are argillaceous with a light greyish suffusion and no pattern. The hindwings are medium grey.

References

Endemic fauna of Nigeria
Moths described in 1967
Perissomasticinae
Moths of Africa